György Schwajda (24 March 1943 in Kispest – 19 April 2010 in Kaposvar) was a Hungarian dramatist and theater director. Schwajda wrote several dramas and was the theater director of the city theater in Kaposvar.

He died after a long serious illness in Kaposvar, Hungary.

References
Obituary

1943 births
2010 deaths
20th-century Hungarian male writers
Hungarian male dramatists and playwrights
People from Kaposvár
20th-century Hungarian dramatists and playwrights